Kuzmyno (translit.

It has a population of 216.

Villages in Mukachevo Raion